The Lord High Constable ( or only Marsk) was a prominent and influential office in Sweden, from the 13th century until 1676, excluding periods when the office was out of use. The office holder was a member of the Swedish Privy Council and, from 1630 and on, the head of the Swedish Council of War. From 1634, the Lord High Constable was one of five Great Officers of the Realm.

Middle Ages

In a letter from 1268, during the reign of Valdemar Birgersson, the title marscalcus of the king is mentioned. The holder of the prestigious title is a nobleman, but it is not possible to decide much about the assignments belonging to it. It is possible that the marsk, or the constable, replaced the stabularius that previously governed the king's mounted following.

Constable Torgils Knutsson was the foremost among the powerful men that ruled Sweden during the childhood of king Birger Magnusson in the late 13th century. Later constables seem to only occasionally be called upon by the king, without having regular tasks to fulfill. Queen Margaret, who tried to reclaim power that previous kings had lost, chose to have neither a Lord High Constable nor a Lord High Steward. Her successor Eric of Pomerania was forced by the Swedish noblemen to appoint a constable. Thus, in 1435, Karl Knutsson Bonde, a future Swedish king, became the first constable for quite some time. In a suggestion to a treaty of the Kalmar union from 1436, the constable got responsibilities in two areas: law/justice and heading the country's army in war time. For most of the remaining part of the 15th century, the office was vacant.

Early modern period

Lars Siggesson Sparre, long-time constable of Gustav I, was a significant figure during his king's reign, but the office seemingly still lacked any specific assignment. When something reminiscent of a council of war was founded in 1540, the constable was not included. King Gustav's successor, his oldest son Eric XIV, apparently had plans to modernize the constable office, as did the following rulers John III and Sigismund, but those intentions remained unfulfilled.

The title meant no particular assignment until 1630, when constable Jacob De la Gardie became president of the Council of War (Swedish: first Krigsrätten, later Krigsrådet and Krigskollegium). The Lord High Constable was second in rank of the five Great Officers of the Realm, established in 1634, who was the five most prominent members of the Swedish Privy Council. When Carl Gustaf Wrangel died in 1676, the office was abolished. King Charles XI, who had come to age four years earlier, wanted to avoid appointing new holders of the high offices, once these became vacant. The riksmarsk title has not been used since, in contrast to two other offices that Charles XI abolished, Lord High Chancellor and Lord High Steward, who were both revived for a relatively short period in the late 18th century.

Related offices
A number of other high offices, that namewise are somewhat similar to the riksmarsk and to some degree inherited assignments that earlier had been attached to the constable office, have figurated in Swedish history.

The fodermarsk appeared in the late Middle Ages and was responsible for the foddering of the court's horses.
The first hovmarskalk, Marshal of the Court, was appointed in c. 1540 and the office is still in use. Earlier, the office holder was supervising the economy of the court. Today's First Marshal of the Court is the head of the Office of the Marshal of the Court (Hovmarskalkämbetet), which is responsible for preparing the public appearances and state visits of the Swedish Royal Family.
Göran Klasson Stjernsköld became the first  riksmarskalk, Marshal of the Realm, in 1607. As such, he was the head of the royal court, and that is still a valid description for the holder of the office.

Lord High Constables of Sweden
Torgils Knutsson (c. 1290–1306)
Charles Ulvsson, Lord of Tofta (1364-1371)
Karl Knutsson Bonde (1435-?)
Nils Stensson Natt och Dag (1439) 
Tord Karlsson Bonde (1453 or 1454–1456)
Ture Turesson (Bielke) (1457-1464)
Svante Nilsson Sture the Elder (1497-?)
Lars Siggesson Sparre (1523-1554)
Svante Nilsson Sture the Younger (1561-1564) 
Gustaf Olofsson Stenbock (1569-1572)
Klas Fleming (c. 1591-?)
Magnus Brahe (1602-1611)
Axel Nilsson Ryning (1611-1620)
Jacob De la Gardie (1620-1652)
Gustaf Horn (1653-1657)
Adolf Johan of Pfalz-Zweibrücken (1660)
Lars Kagg (1660-1661)
Carl Gustaf Wrangel (1664-1676)

Gallery

References

13th-century establishments in Sweden
Co